Jiba Lamichhane is an entrepreneur and former president of International Coordination Council (ICC) of Non Resident Nepali Association (NRNA). He was one of the founder members of  NRNA (Non Resident Nepali Association).

Education
He graduated with a MSc in Civil Engineering  from Moscow State University in Moscow, Russia.

Award
He was awarded “Prawal Janasewshree”, one of the highest states of honor in Nepal, by the President of Nepal Dr Ram Baran Yadav for his outstanding contribution to Nepal and Nepali Diaspora.

Bibliography
He has published a travel memoir ‘Sarsarti Sansaar’.

See also
Shesh Ghale
Kumar Panta

References

External links
 
Nagariknews-'सरसर्ती संसार'मा जीवाका अनुभूति
Nagariksandesh-जीवा लामिछाने भन्छन्–सिर्जना तथा समर्पणमा प्रतिस्पर्धा हुँदैन 
Ghatnarabichar-जीवा लामिछाने अध्यक्षमा निर्विरोध निर्वाचित
Facebook page of Jiba Lamichhane

Nepalese businesspeople
Nepalese expatriates in Russia
Living people
1967 births
Nepalese people
People from Chitwan District
21st-century Nepalese businesspeople